A total of 73 World Championship seasons of Formula One (F1) have been run. F1 is the highest form of open wheeled auto racing series regulated by the Fédération Internationale de l'Automobile (FIA), motorsport's world governing body. The "formula" in the name alludes to a series of rules established by the FIA to which all participants and vehicles are required to conform. , the sporting regulations established by the FIA's Statutes state that the minimum number of events needed to form a F1 season is 8. The season can be declared a World Championship if F1 visits at least 3 continents in that season according to the International Sporting Code. The World Championship rule can be declared invalid if the FIA grants F1 an waiver for its "long‐established use of the word 'World'." Each season throughout F1 history has been made up of between 7 and 22 , and the regulations are regularly amended to enable an increase of the maximum number of permitted races each year.

The World Drivers' Championship is awarded to the most successful F1 driver over the course of the season, as determined by a points system based on Grand Prix results, and has been awarded since the first F1 season in 1950. The championship is the successor of the pre-war AIACR European Championship held between 1931 and 1939. The World Constructors' Championship is awarded to the most successful Formula One constructor over the course of the season, as determined by a points system based on Grand Prix results. Different combinations of chassis and engine makes are considered to be different constructors for the purposes of the Championship. Constructors' Championship points are calculated by adding points scored in each race by any driver for that constructor. Up until , most seasons saw only the highest-scoring driver in each race for each constructor contributing points towards the Championship. On only 11 occasions has the World Constructors' Champion team not contained the World Drivers' Champion for that season.

 a total of 1,081 Formula One World Championship races have been held in 34 countries. Over 72 seasons, there have been 34 participants from 15 different nationalities who have won the World Drivers' Championship, with Michael Schumacher and Lewis Hamilton tied for the record for the highest number of titles won with seven. Over 64 seasons, 15 teams representing 5 individual nations that have claimed the World Constructors' Championship, with Ferrari winning more titles than any other squad with 16. Seasons which were run to F1 rules prior to the inaugural World Championship season in 1950 and those that were part of each of the British Formula One Championship and the South African Formula One Championship are not included in this list.

Seasons

Notes

References

Bibliography

External links

 
 Formula One official website
 FIA official website

 
Seasons